The Eastern Sports Association was a professional wrestling promotion based in Halifax, Nova Scotia from 1969 to 1977. Former employees in the ESA consisted of professional wrestlers, managers, play-by-play and color commentators, announcers, interviewers and referees.

Alumni

Male wrestlers

Female wrestlers

Midget wrestlers

Stables and tag teams

Commentators and interviewers

Referees

Other personnel

References

External links
Eastern Sports Association / Atlantic Grand Prix Wrestling alumni at OWW.com
Eastern Sports Association alumni at Wrestlingdata.com

Eastern Sports Association alumni